French's is an American brand of prepared mustard, condiments, fried onions, and other food items that was created by Robert Timothy French. French's "Cream Salad Brand" mustard debuted to the world at the 1904 St. Louis World's Fair. By 1921, French's Mustard had adopted its trademark pennant and begun advertising to the general public. French's is now owned by McCormick & Company.

History

Brothers Robert and George French bought a flour mill in 1883 in Fairport, New York. It burned down in 1884 and they relocated the flour mill to Rochester, New York. They named their mill the R.T. French Company. Robert French died in 1893 and brother George became company president. George (who developed the creamy yellow mustard) and another brother, Francis, introduced French's mustard in 1904.

In 1926, French's was sold to J. & J. Colman of the United Kingdom, a company that produced home care products such as Lysol, Reckitt's Blue and Brasso, and its own mustard brand, as well as other products such as the Frank's RedHot condiment line.

In 1928, the Atlantis Sales Corporation was formed as a subsidiary of R. T. French to handle sales and distribution of French's, Reckitt, and Colman products. Atlantis remained a separate entity through the nineteen-fifties.

In 1960, French's purchased L. C. Forman and Sons Pickle Company of Pittsford, New York. Forman produced a variety of pickle products, including a well-known piccalilli relish.

In 1965, French's introduced a new line of "Cattlemen’s" barbecue sauce. The line was inaugurated with the trip of a horse-drawn "chuck wagon" from Buffalo, New York, across upstate New York to New York City and then to Philadelphia,  Pennsylvania, in June, 1965.

In 1970, the company purchased Widmer Wine Cellars of Naples, New York. The winery was sold in 1983.

In 1985, the company sold its instant potato operations in Shelley, Idaho, to Pillsbury.

In 1986, Reckitt & Colman acquired Durkee Famous Foods; in 1987 and consolidated headquarters in New Jersey. Durkee's French onions became French's crispy fried onions.

In 1999, Reckitt & Colman merged with Benckiser NV to form Reckitt Benckiser.

In 2017, McCormick & Company acquired French's from Reckitt Benckiser.

For many years, the fictitious "Carol French" was the face of the company. Her name appeared on numerous recipes and cookbooks, the oldest of which may be Dining Delights from 1948.

Locations
Until 1987, French's headquarters was located in Rochester, New York. The headquarters is now located in Chester, New Jersey. During its heyday, French's was a sponsor of the local weather forecast, featuring its address prominently in television advertising. They also were a prominent sponsor of the Rochester Red Wings baseball club, often in conjunction with a local brand of hot dogs, Zweigle's. The former headquarters location at 1 Mustard Street is now home to a variety of professional offices and public agencies.

French's also had facilities in Shelley, Idaho, for potato products. A plant in Souderton, Pennsylvania, was constructed in 1957 and closed in the 1990s. A plant in Fresno, California, closed in 1994. Manufacturing operations were consolidated in Springfield, Missouri.

Products
Historically R. T. French may have manufactured a complete line of spices and extracts, condiments, pickle products, sauces and gravy mixes, instant potato products, and pet care products, in particular canary and parakeet seeds.
As of 2016, in certain markets French's markets mustards, Worcestershire sauce, a line of mayonnaise-based products, ketchup, barbecue sauce, potato sticks, and fried jalapeños, as well as a line of French's fried onions.

See also
 List of mustard brands

References

Further reading

External links

 Collection of mid-twentieth century advertising featuring French's products from the TJS Labs Gallery of Graphic Design.
 R.T. French and the Fairport Connection

Reckitt brands
Brand name condiments
Mustard brands
History of Rochester, New York
Products introduced in 1904
American brands
2017 mergers and acquisitions
McCormick & Company brands